Rita Borbás (born 21 December 1980 in Budapest) is a former Hungarian handballer.

She made her international debut on 2 March 2005 against Denmark. She participated on the World Championship yet in that year and she was present on the next one in 2007.

Borbás also took part on the European Championship in 2006 and represented Hungary on the 2008 Summer Olympics in China, where the national team finished fourth.

Achievements
Nemzeti Bajnokság I:
Winner: 2005
Silver Medallist: 2004, 2008, 2010, 2011
Bronze Medallist: 2006, 2007
Magyar Kupa:
Winner: 2005
Silver Medallist: 2004, 2008, 2011
Bronze Medallist: 2007
Liga Naţională:
Winner: 2009
EHF Cup:
Finalist: 2004, 2005
World Championship:
Bronze Medallist: 2005

References

External links
 Rita Borbás career statistics at Worldhandball

1980 births
Living people
Handball players from Budapest
Hungarian female handball players
Handball players at the 2008 Summer Olympics
Olympic handball players of Hungary
Expatriate handball players
Hungarian expatriate sportspeople in Romania
Győri Audi ETO KC players
20th-century Hungarian women
21st-century Hungarian women